Taciana Rezende de Cesar Baldé (née Lima) (born 12 December 1988 in Olinda) is a Brazilian born Bissau-Guinean judoka. She competed at the 2016 Summer Olympics in the women's 48 kg event, in which she was eliminated in the second round by Galbadrakhyn Otgontsetseg She was the flag bearer for Guinea-Bissau during the closing ceremony.

In 2019, she competed in the women's 52 kg event at the 2019 World Judo Championships held in Tokyo, Japan.

She competed in the women's 52 kg event at the 2020 Summer Olympics.

References

External links
 

1988 births

Living people

Brazilian people of Bissau-Guinean descent
Citizens of Guinea-Bissau through descent
Bissau-Guinean people of Brazilian descent
Bissau-Guinean female judoka
Olympic judoka of Guinea-Bissau
Judoka at the 2016 Summer Olympics
People from Olinda
African Games bronze medalists for Guinea-Bissau
African Games medalists in judo
Competitors at the 2015 African Games
Judoka at the 2020 Summer Olympics